Haraldur Björnsson (born 11 January 1989) is an Icelandic footballer who plays for Stjarnan and the Iceland national football team as a goalkeeper. He was the starting goalkeeper for Iceland U21 at the 2011 UEFA European Under-21 Championship. Björnsson earned his first  cap for the senior national side on 13 January 2016, in the 1:0 win over Finland in a friendly match, substituting Ingvar Jónsson at the half-time mark.

References

External links

1989 births
Living people
Association football goalkeepers
Östersunds FK players
Lillestrøm SK players
Haraldur Bjornsson
Allsvenskan players
Superettan players
Eliteserien players
Norwegian First Division players
Haraldur Bjornsson
Haraldur Bjornsson
Haraldur Bjornsson
Expatriate footballers in Sweden
Expatriate footballers in Norway
Haraldur Bjornsson
Haraldur Bjornsson